The 1991 Hopman Cup was the third edition of the Hopman Cup, an international mixed teams tournament played at the Burswood Entertainment Complex in Perth, Western Australia. The event was held from 27 December 1990 through 4 January 1991.

Twelve teams competed in the tournament with the top four seeded teams (United States, Spain, Switzerland and the Soviet Union) each receiving a bye into the quarter-finals. The remaining eight teams played in the first round. In the final which was played on 4 January, Yugoslav pair, Goran Prpić and Monica Seles won both of their singles matches to defeat the American pair, Zina Garrison and David Wheaton without needing to go with the mixed doubles (which was also won by Yugoslavia).

Teams

Seeds
  – Zina Garrison and David Wheaton (finalists)
  – Arantxa Sánchez Vicario and Emilio Sánchez (quarterfinalists)
  – Manuela Maleeva-Fragniere and Jakob Hlasek (semifinalists)
  – Natalia Zvereva and Andrei Chesnokov (quarterfinalists)
  – Elizabeth Smylie and Pat Cash (quarterfinalists)
  – Monica Seles and Goran Prpić (champions)
  – Regina Rajchrtová and Petr Korda (quarterfinalists)
  – Catherine Tanvier and Guy Forget (semifinalists)

Unseeded
 – Sarah Loosemore and Jeremy Bates (first round)
 – Isabel Cueto and Carl-Uwe Steeb (first round)
 – Raffaella Reggi and Paolo Canè (first round)
 – Manon Bollegraf and Michiel Schapers (first round)

Draw

First round
The opening match of the 1991 Hopman Cup featured local Elizabeth Smylie and Pat Cash taking on Great Britain pair in Sarah Loosemore and Jeremy Bates. Despite losing the opening tie in straight sets, Australia qualified through to the quarter-finals in the mixed doubles.

Australia vs. Great Britain

Czechoslovakia vs. Germany

Yugoslavia vs. Italy

France vs. Netherlands

Quarterfinals

United States vs. Czechoslovakia

Yugoslavia vs. Soviet Union

Switzerland vs. Australia

France vs. Spain

Semifinals

Yugoslavia vs. France

United States vs. Switzerland

Final

Yugoslavia vs. United States

References

External links

1991
Hopman Cup
December 1990 sports events in Australia
January 1991 sports events in Australia